Castiarina bella is a species of beetle in the Buprestidae family, which is endemic to Australia and found along the east coast of Australia between Melbourne and Brisbane. It is a fairly common species in this area. As with other Castiarina species it is typically found on flowering shrubs and trees.

Gallery

References

bella
Beetles described in 1871